The 2022–23 season is Juventus Next Gens fifth season in the Serie C, the third level of Italian football. They will also participate in the Coppa Italia Serie C, the Italian cup for Serie C sides.

Pre-season and friendlies

 Results list Juventus's goal tally first.

Serie C

Matches 

 Results list Juventus Next Gen's goal tally first.

Coppa Italia Serie C

Matches 

 Results list Juventus Next Gen's goal tally first

Transfers

In

Out

Player statistics 

|-
! colspan=14 style=background:#DCDCDC; text-align:center| Goalkeepers

|-
! colspan=14 style=background:#DCDCDC; text-align:center| Defenders

|-
! colspan=14 style=background:#DCDCDC; text-align:center| Midfielders

|-
! colspan=14 style=background:#DCDCDC; text-align:center| Forwards

|}

Notes

References 

Juventus Next Gen seasons
Juventus U23